Tarneit railway station is located on the Deer Park - West Werribee line in Victoria, Australia. It serves the western Melbourne suburb of Tarneit, and it opened on 14 June 2015.

Forming part of the Regional Rail Link project, the project of which the station was built as part of, the station was officially opened by Victorian Premier Daniel Andrews, and the Commonwealth Minister for Infrastructure and Regional Development, Warren Truss, with services commencing on 21 June 2015. It quickly became the second-busiest V/Line station on their network, after Southern Cross.

The station will eventually become part of the metropolitan railway network under the Western Rail Plan, announced by the Andrews State Government in 2018.

Platforms and services

Tarneit has two side platforms. It is serviced by V/Line Geelong line and selected Warrnambool line services.

Platform 1: 
 services to Southern Cross
 weekend services to Southern Cross

Platform 2: 
 services to Wyndham Vale, Geelong and Waurn Ponds
 weekend services to Warrnambool

Transport links

CDC Melbourne operates eight bus routes to and from Tarneit station, under contract to Public Transport Victoria:
: to Williams Landing station
: to Williams Landing station
: to Williams Landing station
: to Hoppers Crossing station
: to Hoppers Crossing station
: to Werribee station
: to Werribee station
: to Werribee station

References

External links

Rail Geelong gallery

Railway stations in Melbourne
Railway stations in Australia opened in 2015
Railway stations in the City of Wyndham